A civil war has been going on in Syria since 2011, following a period of demonstrations and unrest in 2011, which was part of the international wave of protest known as the Arab Spring.
The government, headed by Bashar al-Assad, son of previous leader Hafez al-Assad, is based in Damascus, the traditional capital.

Latest elections

Presidential elections

Parliamentary elections

Local elections

Damascus government
Syria elects on a national level a head of state - the president -  and a legislature. The People's Council (Majlis al-Sha'ab) has 250 members elected for a four-year term in 15 multi-seat constituencies. According to the previous Syrian constitution of 1973, Syria was a form of one-party state in which only one political party, the Arab Socialist Ba'ath Party was legally allowed to hold effective power. Although minor parties were allowed, they were legally required to accept the leadership of the dominant party. The presidential candidate was appointed by the parliament, on suggestion of the Baath Party, and needed to be confirmed for a seven-year term in a national single-candidate referendum. The most recent presidential referendum took place in 2007. The new Syrian constitution of 2012, approved in popular referendum, introduced a multi-party system without guaranteed leadership of any political party. In a new article 88, it introduced presidential elections and limited the term of office for the president to seven years with a maximum of one re-election.

During the French Mandate and after the independence, the parliamentary elections in Syria have been held under a system similar to the Lebanese one, with fixed representation for every religious community, including Druzes, Alawis and Christians. In 1949 the system was modified, giving women the right to vote.

Election law
In August 2011, President Assad signed Decree No. 101 on amending the General Elections Law. The Law stipulates that elections are to be held with public, secret, direct and equal voting where each Syrian voter, eighteen years and older, has one vote. The Law does not allow army members and policemen in service to participate in elections. It also provides for forming a higher judicial committee for elections, with its headquarters in Damascus to monitor the elections and ensure its integrity, in addition to forming judicial sub-committees in every Syrian province affiliated with the higher committee.

In March 2015, President Assad signed General Elections Law No.5 which replaced previous election laws.

References

External links
IFES Election guide - Country profile: Syria